KUVM-LD, virtual and VHF digital channel 10, is a low-powered television station serving Houston, Texas, United States that is licensed to Missouri City. The station is owned by HC2 Holdings.

History
The station began in 2007 on channel 10 with the call sign K10PY-D. The station converted to digital transmission in October 2009, initially running a simulcast of KHLM until that station obtained a digital signal of its own, and later replacing it with the Azteca América programming of former analog station KUVM-CA, and changing its call sign to KUVM-LD on October 9, 2009. The station's signal moved to channel 40 from the Missouri City tower farm on July 24, 2010.

On April 25, 2010, Azteca América programming began airing on KNWS, which Una Vez Más Holdings had contracted to buy. KUVM-LD dropped Azteca América from its 4th subchannel on January 25, 2011.

Citing interference from KUBE-TV, the station applied on November 5, 2010 to move its physical channel from 40 to 14. That application was denied, and the station filed to move to channel 18 in January 2012, and also filed to move to channel 22 in February 2012. The application to move to channel 22 was granted May 29, 2012, and the station finalized that move in October 2012.

In June 2013, KUVM-LD was slated to be sold to Landover 5 LLC as part of a larger deal involving 51 other low-power television stations. the sale fell through in June 2016. Mako Communications sold its stations, including KUVM-LD, to HC2 Holdings in 2017.

KUVM-LD was licensed to move to digital channel 10 on February 9, 2021.

Digital channels
The station's digital signal is multiplexed:

References

External links

 

Innovate Corp.
UVM-LD
Low-power television stations in the United States
Spanish-language television stations in Texas
1980 establishments in Texas
Television channels and stations established in 1980